Jugoslavija was a Yugoslav multilingual illustrated arts magazine published between 1949 and 1959. Its full title in English was Yugoslavia: An Illustrated Magazine. The magazine was based in Belgrade. The magazine was a propaganda publication which included articles on arts and advertising illustrations.

History and content
The first issue of Jugoslavija was published in Fall 1949. The founding editor of the illustrated magazine was Oto Bihalji-Merin. He was a Serbian writer, art historian and curator. The magazine was published biannually in Serbo-Croatian, English and German. Later French and Russian language editions were added. The magazine was distributed abroad, since its goal was to present sociopolitical situation, national treasures and touristic places of Yugoslavia to the Western readers. It also contained articles reflecting Balkan culture. Some volumes were dedicated to single republics within Yugoslavia, including Bosnia and Herzegovina, Macedonia and Slovenia which had either small population or were located at the far end of the country or had a multicultural structure. However, the magazine never featured Croatia or Serbia of which population was dominant in the federation.

Oto Bihalji-Merin edited the magazine until 1959 when it ceased publication.

References

External links
 WorldCat record

1949 establishments in Yugoslavia
1959 disestablishments in Yugoslavia
Biannual magazines
Cultural magazines
Defunct magazines published in Yugoslavia
Eastern Bloc mass media
Magazines established in 1949
Magazines disestablished in 1959
Mass media in Belgrade
Multilingual magazines
Propaganda newspapers and magazines
Socialist magazines